Francis Dewsbury Pinfold was a doctor and mayor of Hamilton from 1931 to 1933.

Life and family 

Francis Dewsbury Pinfold was the 4th son of Elizabeth Pinfold (née Marks), and Reverend Pinfold, born in 1892 in New Plymouth. His father, James Thomas Pinfold (28 April 1855-30 July 1933), was a Methodist minister at Thames, Gisborne, Hamilton, Rangiora, Springston, Mosgiel and Wellington. Francis was one of 10 children and went to school at Hamilton West, Auckland Grammar and Christchurch Boys’ High. 

He qualified as a doctor at Otago University in 1915. As a student he took jobs building Otago Central railway, shearing and school teaching. He became a resident clinician at Dunedin Hospital, a junior and then senior house surgeon at Waikato Hospital, from which he resigned in 1916 to join the army. Shortly after, he married Claudine Heather Norman on 18 April 1916. In 1917 he joined the New Zealand Expeditionary Force as a major with the Medical Corps on the Western Front. On his return he started a practice at 389 Victoria St. 

He was a hunter, fisherman and president of Waikato Acclimatisation Society and Hamilton Gun Club. He was also active in Hamilton Orphans’ Club, Hamilton Fire Board, Auckland Acclimatisation Society, Auckland Swimming Centre, Whitiora School Committee and Okete (Camp Fergusson) and Port Waikato Children’s Camps. son Francis Norman Pinfold.

Mayoralty 

He was elected as a councillor on Hamilton Borough Council in 1925. In 1929 he lost a mayoral election against John Fow by 82 votes, but won the next election against him by 272, standing on a platform of opposing a "Mad orgy of spending". He supported paving more footpaths, but opposed the Anglesea cutting and removal of Garden Place hill. Hamilton Municipal Offices on Alma Street were built during his term in office. All but two councillors supported him standing again in 1933, but John Fow won by 678 votes. Dr Pinfold put his name forward for mayor in 1938, but then withdrew it. He twice stood to be a candidate for the National Party in 1943 and 1959.

Death 
He died on 19 October 1976 and was cremated at Hamilton Park Cemetery, Newstead.

References

External links 
Photos - 1927, 1947, 1950

1892 births
1976 deaths
Mayors of Hamilton, New Zealand